The 2022 season was Grêmio Foot-Ball Porto Alegrense's 119th season in existence and the club's. In addition to the Campeonato Brasileiro Série B, Grêmio participates in this season's editions of the Copa do Brasil, the Campeonato Gaúcho, and the Recopa Gaúcha. The season covers the period from 26 January 2022 to 6 November 2022, a shorter season due to the 2022 FIFA World Cup.

Squad information

First team squad

Competitions

Overview

Recopa Gaúcha

Campeonato Gaúcho

Results summary

First stage

Table

Results by matchday

Matches
The first stage fixtures were announced on 25 November 2021.

Note: Match numbers indicated on the left hand side are references to the matchday scheduled by the Campeonato Gaúcho and not the order matches were played after postponements and rescheduled matches.

Knockout stage

Semi-finals

Finals

Campeonato Brasileiro Série B

League table

Results summary

Results by matchday

Matches
The league fixtures were announced on 3 February 2022.

Copa do Brasil

First round
The draw for the first round was held on 17 January 2022, 13:00 UTC−03:00, at the CBF headquarters in Rio de Janeiro.

Notes

References

2022 Season
Brazilian football clubs 2022 season